St Paul's Tower is a skyscraper located on Arundel Gate in Sheffield, South Yorkshire. The city's first skyscraper, it was constructed as the centrepiece of the St Paul's Place project as part of the Heart of the City redevelopment of Sheffield city centre. 

The tower is set to be overtaken as the tallest building in Sheffield by the under-construction Code Sheffield development at 117m (384ft), which will also become the tallest building in Yorkshire upon completion.

History
The site of St Paul's Tower was occupied from 1740 by a chapel of ease of the nearby Sheffield Cathedral known as St Paul's Church, from which the skyscraper takes its name. The Sheffield Town Hall was constructed next to the church in the 1890s, and the church was subsequently demolished in 1938 to make way for an area of gardens next to the Town Hall known originally as St Paul's Gardens.

In 1977, two brutalist extensions to the Town Hall, nicknamed The Egg Box and The Wedding Cake due to their designs, were constructed over the eastern section of St Paul's Gardens (the western remainder subsequently became the Peace Gardens). These buildings were occupied by the offices of Sheffield City Council; however, their contrasting design alongside the 1890s Renaissance Revival style Town Hall proved controversial throughout their existence.

In the early 2000s, two new office buildings, namely Derwent House and Howden House, were constructed a short distance to the south along Arundel Gate to house the relocated Sheffield City Council offices, and the 1970s Town Hall Extension was subsequently emptied and demolished in 2002. This left the site once again unoccupied. Following the completion of the Peace Gardens, Millennium Square and Winter Gardens as part of the Heart of the City project, attention turned to the former Egg Box site, now named St Paul's Place.

Design and development
Planning permission for the project was first granted in October 2005, with excavation work beginning in May 2006 and construction officially commencing in May 2007. The construction process of the development was originally due to be completed by late 2008.

The development includes a total of 316 one- and two-bedroom apartments located in the main skyscraper and an adjacent nine-storey mid-rise building named St Paul's View, linked by ground-floor retail. The project's design is conservatively modern, complementing the surrounding buildings such as the adjacent Grade I listed Town Hall and the modern Winter Garden. According to the official website for the project:

Construction

Administration of City Lofts Group
On 4 July 2008, it was announced that the company leading this project, City Lofts Group Plc, had gone into administration. The insolvency followed from a series of large financial losses, spiralling lending costs and falling property market values. Although construction at St Paul's Tower was not immediately affected, a number of completed developments were placed under the control of the administrators (Ernst & Young).

Cladding controversy
On 3 October 2008, the BBC Look North news programme reported that the exterior cladding for the main tower had been significantly changed due to costs and was causing concern amongst Sheffield City Council planning officials and the wider public. Two well-known websites that had been following the construction of the tower reported that the council was calling a halt to any more cladding being placed on the building pending a decision as to whether the new design complied with the original plans. A revised set of design plans was drafted before being finally approved in December 2008. The new plans removed or modified certain features of the build, such as the removal of the spire and increased thickness of the window frames.

Occupants
St Paul's Tower predominantly consists of apartments, containing a mixture of one and two bedrooms. However, provision for retail space was provided at the ground level of both the main skyscraper, fronting onto Arundel Gate, and the adjacent St Paul's View mid-rise, fronting onto Millennium Square; the two buildings are linked by ground-floor retail.

The entire ground-floor retail space of St Paul's Tower has been occupied by a Sainsbury's Local supermarket since July 2011. On the St Paul's View side of the building, the retail space is currently split between two restaurants: a Cosmo's and a Pizza Express.

References

Notes

External links

Residential buildings completed in 2011
Saint Pauls Tower